Snow Flake ~Kioku no Koshitsu~ / Pulse  is FLOW's seventeenth single. PULSE was the official image song of the world’s biggest snowboard event "X-TRAIL JAM in TOKYO DOME ‘08." It reached #24 on the Oricon charts in its first week and charted for 4 weeks. *

Track listing

References

Flow (band) songs
2008 singles
Ki/oon Music singles
2008 songs
Song articles with missing songwriters